Salvatore Giuliano is a 1962 Italian film directed by Francesco Rosi. Shot in a neo-realist documentary, non-linear style, it follows the lives of those involved with the famous Sicilian bandit Salvatore Giuliano. Giuliano is mostly off-screen during the film and appears most notably as a corpse.

Cast
 Salvo Randone as President of Viterbo Assize Court
 Frank Wolff as Gaspare Pisciotta
 Pietro Cammarata as Salvatore Giuliano	
 Sennuccio Benelli as Reporter	
 Giuseppe Calandra as Minor Official	
 Max Cartier as Francesco	
 Fernando Cicero as Bandit	
 Bruno Ukmar as Spy	
 Cosimo Torino as Frank Mannino	
 Federico Zardi as Pisciotta’s Defense Counsel
 Francesco Rosi (narration)

Reception

Derek Malcolm called it "almost certainly the best film about the social and political forces that have shaped Sicily, that benighted island." Gino Moliterno argued that "Rosi's highly original strategy in this landmark film is to aim at neither an "objective" journalistic documentary nor a fictional recreation but to employ as wide a range of disparate formal and stylistic elements as necessary to conduct a committed search for the truth that becomes, in a sense, its own narrative."

David Gurevich said that "Rosi marries the neo-realist, black-and-white, populist aesthetic to the mad media circus of La Dolce Vita, tosses in some minimalist alienation from Antonioni, makes the film jump back and forth in time without any markers (so that you realize you're back in the present only a few minutes after you're already in a sequence), and makes his despair so infectious that we would probably be disappointed to know the truth." Terrence Rafferty noted that "Salvatore Giuliano manages to sustain an almost impossible balance of immediacy and reflection: it's such an exciting piece of filmmaking that you might not realize until the end that its dominant tone is contemplative, even melancholy."

Director Martin Scorsese listed Salvatore Giuliano as one of his twelve favorite films of all time.

Awards
Silver Bear for Best Director, 1962
Silver Ribbon Award for Best Cinematography, 1963
Silver Ribbon Award for Best Director, 1963
Silver Ribbon Award for Best Score, 1963

See also
 Salvatore Giuliano, a 1986 Italian opera by Lorenzo Ferrero
 The Sicilian, a novel by Mario Puzo based on the life of Salvatore Giuliano
 The Sicilian, a film based on the novel, directed by Michael Cimino

References

Bibliography
 Gesù Sebastiano (a cura di), Francesco Rosi, Giuseppe Maimone Editore, Catania 1993
 Kezich Tullio e Sebastiano Gesù (a cura di), Salvatore Giuliano, Giuseppe Maimone Editore, Catania 1993
 Annarita Curcio, Salvatore Giuliano: una parabola storica, https://www.doppiozero.com/materiali/salvatore-giuliano-una-parabola-storica

External links
 
 
 Salvatore Giuliano an essay by Michel Ciment at the Criterion Collection
 
 

1962 films
1960s Italian-language films
Sicilian-language films
Italian crime films
1962 crime drama films
Political drama films
Films about the Sicilian Mafia
Italian docudrama films
Films set in the 1940s
Films set in the 1950s
Biographical films about Italian bandits
Films set in Sicily
Films shot in Sicily
Films directed by Francesco Rosi
Films with screenplays by Suso Cecchi d'Amico
Lux Film films
Films scored by Piero Piccioni
Salvatore Giuliano
1960s Italian films